Gnathifera paropsias is a moth in the family Epermeniidae. It was described by Reinhard Gaedike in 1972. It is found in Australia.

References

Epermeniidae
Moths described in 1972
Moths of Australia